Rob Roth is an American multidisciplinary artist and director based in New York City. He works in a variety of media including theater, video, sculpture and performance. Roth received his BFA from Pratt Institute and has exhibited different work at a variety of venues including the New Museum, Performance Space 122, HERE Arts Center,  Museum of Arts and Design, and Deitch Projects. His work had its early fertilization in the 1990s New York City nightlife arena, most notably at the underground nightclub, Jackie 60 / MOTHER, as well as The Black Party.

In 2018, Roth premiered the theater piece Soundstage, featuring actor Rebecca Hall. He also directed the music video Doom or Destiny by Blondie featuring Joan Jett which appeared on several "Best of 2017" lists as well as performing in Atlas Obscura's site specific Into the Veil event at Green-Wood Cemetery. In 2016, Roth presented his site specific sound installation Night Paving: The Aural History of Jackie 60 and Mother on NYC's Highline. Most recently, Roth was creative director on Debbie Harry's memoir Face It as well as directing the short film "Blondie: Vivir En La Habana" which had its North American premiere at the 20th Anniversary of Tribeca Film Festival.

References

External links 
 Official website
 SOUNDSTAGE – A LIVE THEATER AND FILM HYBRID
 Debbie Harry talking new memoir 'Face It' with Chris Stein in NYC
 The NYC Nightlife Scene is Brighter, Thanks to These 10 Future Stars
 THE HANGOVER REPORT – Rob Roth’s technically astounding hybrid performance piece SOUNDSTAGE mesmerizes at HERE – Interludes
 Rob Roth Previews the Black Party, a ‘Night to Let Go of Your Inhibitions’ (Published 2017)
 Video Artist / Performer Rob Roth Debuts His Film "Screen Test" at MAD
 A Patent Leather Life: Interview with Rob Roth
 www.huffpost.com/entry/michael-cavadias-and-rob-roth-mystery-of-claywoman
 https://www.rollingstone.com/music/music-news/blondie-tide-is-high-cuba-documentary-clip-1184602/

Living people
Artists from New York City
1968 births